Phongsapak Kerdlaphee (born 7 May 1998) is a Thai tennis player.

Kerdlaphee has a career high ATP singles ranking of 1768 achieved on 25 September 2017. He also has a career high ATP doubles ranking of 1602 achieved on 10 September 2018.

Kerdlaphee represents Thailand at the Davis Cup, where he has a W/L record of 0–1.

References

External links

1998 births
Living people
Phongsapak Kerdlaphee
Phongsapak Kerdlaphee